Streptomyces laurentii is a bacterium species from the genus of Streptomyces which has been isolated from soil. Streptomyces laurentii produces thiostrepton.

See also 
 List of Streptomyces species

References

Further reading

External links
Type strain of Streptomyces laurentii at BacDive -  the Bacterial Diversity Metadatabase

laurentii
Bacteria described in 1979